The men's time trial class C3 road cycling event at the 2020 Summer Paralympics took place on 31 August 2021 at Fuji Speedway, Japan. 14 riders from 11 different nations competed in this event.

The C3 classification is for cyclists with moderate hemiplegic or diplegic spasticity; moderate athetosis or ataxia; bilateral below knee or unilateral through knee amputation, etcetera.

Results
The event took place on 31 August 2021, at 14:21:

References

Men's road time trial C3